Narcissism self-centered personality style

Narcissism may also refer to:
 Healthy narcissism, a normal developmental personality trait
 Narcissistic personality disorder, clinical condition, pathological self-centeredness 
 History of narcissism, the history of the meaning of narcissism
 Narcissus (mythology), Greek mythological character

Entertainment
 Narcissistic Cannibal, single from American metal band Korn
 Malignant Narcissism (song), an instrumental track from Rush's 2007 album Snakes & Arrows
 Narcissus, a 2017 single from Róisín Murphy also included on the 2020 album, Róisín Machine.

Plants
 Narcissus (plant), a genus of predominantly spring flowering perennial plants
 Narcissus bulbocodium, petticoat daffodil or hoop-petticoat daffodil
 Narcissus papyraceus, a perennial bulbous plant native to the Mediterranean region
 Narcissus pseudonarcissus, wild daffodil or lent lily
 Narcissus in culture, daffodil or jonquil plant associated with a number of themes in different cultures

Other
 Narcissistic rage and narcissistic injury, a significant wound to the ego
 Narcissistic leadership, a leadership style (management)
 Narcissistic number, integer expressible as the sum of the (number of digits)th power of each of its digits (mathematics)

See also
 Narcissa (disambiguation)
 Narcissus (disambiguation)